Hackney Wick is a neighbourhood in east London, England.

Hackney Wick may also refer to:

 Hackney Wicked, an annual arts festival in Hackney Wick
 Hackney Wick FC, a football club
 Hackney Wick railway station
 Hackney Wick Stadium, a former greyhound racing stadium
 Hackney Wick Wolves, a speedway opened in 1935 at Hackney Wick Stadium

See also 
 Hackney (disambiguation)
 Wick (disambiguation)